A Hen on a Wall (French:Une poule sur un mur) is a 1936 French crime film directed by Maurice Gleize and starring Jules Berry, Pierre Larquey and Christiane Delyne. The title refers to a French children's song.

Cast
 Jules Berry as Henri Sornin  
 Pierre Larquey as Bob Pouvrier  
 Christiane Delyne as Betty Pouvrier  
 Monique Rolland as Fossette Sornin  
 Saturnin Fabre as Monsieur Amédée  
 Sinoël as L'oncle Albert  
 Jeanne Fusier-Gir
 Andrée Champeaux 
 Serjius as Gustave  
 René Alié 
 Jacqueline Prévot
 Georges Bever
 Carlos Machado

References

Bibliography 
 Crisp, Colin. Genre, Myth and Convention in the French Cinema, 1929-1939. Indiana University Press, 2002.

External links 
 

1936 crime films
French crime films
1936 films
1930s French-language films
Films directed by Maurice Gleize
French black-and-white films
1930s French films